Aunuu is a small volcanic island off the southeastern shore of Tutuila in Saole County, American Samoa. Politically, it is a part of the Eastern District, one of the two primary political divisions of American Samoa.

Aunuu Crater contains the freshwater Fa'amulivai Marsh, the largest such wetland in American Samoa.  It was formed from the drainage of the low-lying crater. It is part of a protected National Natural Landmark on Aunuu that was designated in 1972. The Pacific black duck was seen in the marsh in 1976, but it may now be extinct in the region; another significant local bird is the purple swamphen. This marsh is the only place in American Samoa where the Chinese water chestnut grows.

Since the 1960s, the Aunuu people’s main economic activity has been growing taro and producing faausi.

Demographics

Aunuu has two historical sub-divisions: Salevatia, and Alofasau.

Geography

Aunu’u is the only place in American Samoa where taro is cultivated in paddy fields, which occupies about 5 percent of the land. The remaining land is mostly wet and unsuitable for cultivation and is primarily covered by non-edible trees, bushes, shrubs and weeds. Agricultural runoff and erosion do not appear to threaten nearshore water quality, as these flow into Pala Lake and the wetlands areas (Pedersen 2000; Tuionoula 2010). Aunu’u is said to produce the best taro in American Samoa (Best 1992).

Geology
The island is less than 1 sq. mi. in area, and around half of that area is a cultivated plain on which Aunuu’s villages are located. There are several beaches consisting of coral rubble and sand, and sea cliffs. The eastern half of Aunuu is rimmed by a geologically recent volcanic cone. The highest point on the crater rim is 310 feet above sea level. Within the crater is the Faimulivai Marsh, which contains a freshwater pond. The crater is one of the few places in American Samoa where evidence of the more recent episodes of volcanism can be observed. The eruptions at Aunuu occurred at approximately the same time as the volcanism at Leala Shoreline in Taputimu, while the eruptions that formed Rainmaker Mountain, Matafao Peak, and the ridges of Vaiava Strait are much older. Aunuu Island has the only quicksand area in American Samoa, and also the territory's only lakes: Pala Lake is just north of the village, and Red Lake is inside the crater.  Maamaa Cove is on the far eastern edge of the crater.

History
1500-900 BCE - The earliest human settlement of the Samoan archipelago is estimated to be around 2900–3500 years before the present (1500-900 BCE). This estimate is based on dating the ancient Lapita pottery shards that are found throughout the islands. The oldest shards found so far have been in Mulifanua and in Sasoa'a, Falefa. The oldest archaeological evidence found on the islands of Polynesia, Samoa and Tonga all date from around that same period, suggesting that the first settlement occurred around the same time in the region as a whole to include Aunu'u.

100-600AD - The first recorded settlers of the Marquesas were Polynesians who arrived from West Polynesia. Early attempts to carbon-date evidence from the site suggested they arrived before 100 AD, with other estimates proposing settlement from 600 AD, but several more recent independent studies suggest that they arrived more recently. In Te Henua ʻEnana (North Marquesan) and Te Fenua ʻEnata (South Marquesan) oral history - Aunuu is possibly mentioned in Moriori genealogy (23) as Raunuku.6 Kahotu, King of Aunuu, coincides with Kopotu, sixth King of Tonga. Tona-Nui appears in the title of the eighteenth King of Tonga—Havea-Tui Tonga-Nui-i-buibui (N.B.—Modern Tongan for Nui is Lahi).  This is their oral history of where their original settlers came from.

1835 - A whaling vessel set out from Aunu’u for the Manu'a island and was lost at sea with all of its crew in the vicinity of Aunu’u.

1863 - On January 24, 1863 the first Mormon Missionary, Kimo Belio and Samuela Manoa, of Hawaii arrived in Aunuu and were accepted by the Aunuu Matai.

1877 - In this year war commenced in Tutuila. High Chief Mauga rebelled against the Government of Tutuila, the Taimua and Pule, where on December 8, 1877 Mauga escaped to Aunuu where he was defended by Aunuu island warriors from its natural fortress.

1887 - King David Kalākaua of Havaii sent his ship the Kaimiloa to Samoa to seek political alliance with another Polynesian nation. On June 15, 1887 the Kaimiloa arrived in Apia Harbor. With the German presence at Apia Harbor, the Kaimiloa trip was nothing more than a visit. Before returning to Hawaiʻi a few Hawaiʻians left the Kaimiloa to reside on the Samoan Island Aunu'u and marrying Samoans.  Pa Taua, on the west coast of the village of Aunu’u, is the site of ruins that were once towers used to hold the four cannons from the Kaimiloa, a Hawaiian Kingdom steamer. The cannons were used by the people of Aunu’u to repel a canoe fleet invasion and are now on display at the Jean B. Haydon Museum in Pago Pago.

Transportation
Aunuu has a few government cars, and a number of family owned/operated motorboats to shuttle people to and from its small boat harbor in Auasi. A lake, called "Vaisuakoko", or Blood Lake, is nestled in the island’s sprawling crater. Hiking the island is difficult, as it is densely forested and full of thick bushes, with steep cliffs along the south coast. The island has a stretch of red quicksand at Pala Lake, fairly close to the village, and taro swamps behind the village. There is a cove, called “Maamaa Cove,” on the east side of the island.

Boats providing ferry service to and from Aunu’u may be hired at the boat dock at Au’asi on Tutuila. The American Samoa Department of Port Administration maintains facilities at Au’asi and Aunu’u but does not track vessel arrival or departure data in either location (C. King 2010b). Aunu’u is popular for hiking and school tours. The coral reef surrounding Aunu’u is considered low use for recreational snorkeling (Spurgeon et al. 2004).

Wildlife

Aunuu has a population of around fifty gray ducks (anas superciliosa), locally known as toloa. Pairs of these birds have also been sighted in Futiga, Nuuuli, Alao, and Leone, however, they may not be based on those islands; they may belong to the population that lives on Aunuu.

Notable people
 Faalupega o Aunuu Afio Lupega (Lemafa ma Lutali), Susu le Sa’o (Sagale), Afio le Tama-a-aiga (Fonoti), Susu Sa’ole o le Ma’opu, Mamalu maia oulua fofoga o le Sa’ole (Taufi ma Fuiava), ma le suafa o Gogo Faapea foi le mamalu ia Saleaaumua. 

 Aifili Paulo Lauvao (December 24, 1919 – August 1, 2002), was twice governor of American Samoa (1985–1989, 1993–1997). The founder of the U.S territory's Democratic Party, he had a long career in the legislature and the judiciary in American Samoa. Governor Lutali was a preservationist who wanted to preserve large areas of the territory's nature. Lutali also worked to preserve American Samoa's ancient sites and historical buildings. He revitalized the Historic Preservation Office.

 Tiaina Baul "Junior" Seau Jr. (/ˈseɪ.aʊ/; SAY-ow; January 19, 1969 – May 2, 2012) was an American professional football player who was a linebacker in the National Football League (NFL). Known for his passionate play, he was a nine-time All-Pro, 12-time Pro Bowl selection, and named to the NFL 1990s All-Decade Team. He was elected posthumously to the Pro Football Hall of Fame in 2015.

See also
 List of National Natural Landmarks in American Samoa

Sources

References

Aunuu: Block Group 4, Census Tract 9502, Eastern District, United States Census Bureau

Islands of American Samoa
National Natural Landmarks in American Samoa
Villages in American Samoa
Volcanoes of American Samoa